Mau Narok is a small town in Kenya's Nakuru County.

References 

Mau Narok is one of the sub county in Njoro constituency located on South East of Njoro town. It is known for agriculture where locals grow cabbages, potatoes and tomatoes. It is neighbouring Mau Forest hence the place is very cold during winters. People who live there are Maasai, Kikuyu and Kalenjins.

Populated places in Rift Valley Province